Hypsipyla fluviatella is a species of snout moth in the genus Hypsipyla. It was described by Schaus in 1913, and is known from Costa Rica.

References

Moths described in 1913
Phycitini